Welcome Home Brother Charles (also known as Soul Vengeance) is a 1975 American blaxploitation film written and directed by Jamaa Fanaka. The film stars Marlo Monte as a wrongfully imprisoned man who seeks vengeance upon his transgressors using his prehensile penis. The film, which was shot on weekends over the course of seven months, was completed while Fanaka was a student of UCLA Film School.

Cast
 Marlo Monte as Charles Murray
 Reatha Grey as Carmen
 Stan Kamber as Jim
 Tiffany Peters as Christina Freeman
 Ben Bigelow as Harry Freeman
 Jake Carter as N.D.
 Jackie Ziegler as Twyla
 Ed Sander as Judge
 Teri Hayden as Judge's Wife
 Stephen Schenck as The Prosecutor
 Kamala James as Prosecutor's Wife

Home media
In 2018, the film was restored in 2K and released on DVD and Blu-ray by Vinegar Syndrome as a double feature with the film Emma Mae.

References

Bibliography

External links
 
 

1970s exploitation films
Blaxploitation films
American exploitation films
Films directed by Jamaa Fanaka
1970s English-language films
1970s American films